In probability theory, the coupon collector's problem describes "collect all coupons and win" contests. It asks the following question: If each box of a brand of cereals contains a coupon, and there are n different types of coupons, what is the probability that more than t boxes need to be bought to collect all n coupons? An alternative statement is: Given n coupons, how many coupons do you expect you need to draw with replacement before having drawn each coupon at least once? For example, when n = 50 it takes about 225 trials on average to collect all 50 coupons.

Solution

Calculating the expectation
Let time T be the number of draws needed to collect all n coupons, and let ti be the time to collect the i-th coupon after i − 1 coupons have been collected. Then . Think of T and ti as random variables. Therefore,  has geometric distribution with expectation . By the linearity of expectations we have:

Here Hn is the n-th harmonic number. Using the asymptotics of the harmonic numbers, we obtain:

where  is the Euler–Mascheroni constant.

Using the Markov inequality to bound the desired probability:

The above can be modified slightly to handle the case when we've already collected some of the coupons. Let k be the number of coupons already collected, then:

And when  then we get the original result.

Calculating the variance
Using the independence of random variables ti, we obtain:

since  (see Basel problem).

Bound the desired probability using the Chebyshev inequality:

Tail estimates

A stronger tail estimate for the upper tail be obtained as follows. Let  denote the event that the -th coupon was not picked in the first  trials. Then

Via a union bound over the  coupons, we obtain

Extensions and generalizations
 Pierre-Simon Laplace, but also Paul Erdős and Alfréd Rényi, proved the limit theorem for the distribution of T. This result is a further extension of previous bounds. A proof is found in.

 Donald J. Newman and Lawrence Shepp gave a generalization of the coupon collector's problem when m copies of each coupon need to be collected. Let Tm be the first time m copies of each coupon are collected. They showed that the expectation in this case satisfies:

Here m is fixed.  When m = 1 we get the earlier formula for the expectation.

 Common generalization, also due to Erdős and Rényi:

 In the general case of a nonuniform probability distribution, according to Philippe Flajolet et al.

This is equal to

where m denotes the number of coupons to be collected and PJ denotes the probability of getting any coupon in the set of coupons J.

See also

 McDonald's Monopoly – an example of the coupon collector's problem that further increases the challenge by making some coupons of the set rarer
 Watterson estimator
 Birthday problem
 Prime number theorem

Notes

References

.
.
.
.

.
.
.

External links
 "Coupon Collector Problem" by Ed Pegg, Jr., the Wolfram Demonstrations Project. Mathematica package.
 How Many Singles, Doubles, Triples, Etc., Should The Coupon Collector Expect?, a short note by Doron Zeilberger.

Articles containing proofs
Gambling mathematics
Probability theorems
Probability problems